Carolan is an unincorporated community in Logan County, Arkansas, United States. It lies five miles to the southwest of Booneville on State Highway 23. Carolan is named for William Philip Carolan, early farmer and merchant in the area. He was born on April 16, 1800 in South Carolina. He was married on September 12, 1822 in South Carolina to Hannah A. (nee Seeley), who was born on April 5, 1807 in South Carolina. Both died in the community of Carolan, on April 16, 1875 and April 9, 1877, respectively. They are buried in the Carolan Community cemetery. An amusing inscription on William Philip Carolan's tombstone describes him as "Baptist and Democrat".

The Founding Family and First Business

One of William Philip Carolan's son, Samuel "Sam" Thompson Carolan, opened the first general store in the community in 1878, three years after his father's death.  "Sam" Carolan also opened a cotton gin and blacksmith shop.  He was also the postmaster. Note: William Philip Carolan was born in 1800 in Chester County,  South Carolina.

In 1918, Samuel "Sam" Thompson Carolan's son, Walter "Emmett" Carolan took over the business with help of his older son, William "Bill" Walter Carolan.  They built the "new" store that included gas pumps and modern conveniences.  
This building stands today.  In 1946,  the family business went to Robert "Bob" L. Carolan, William "Bill" Walter Carolan's younger brother.  The Carolan General Store sold groceries, clothing, farm and feed supplies, drugs, sporting goods and hardware.  The store closed in 1975 with the retirement of Robert "Bob" L. Carolan.

In its heyday, Carolan had a school, and two churches, Baptist and Methodist.

Descendants of William Philip Carolan and Hannah A. (Seeley) Carolan still live in the area.

References

Unincorporated communities in Arkansas
Unincorporated communities in Logan County, Arkansas